Dunne is an Irish surname, derived from the Irish Ó Duinn and Ó Doinn, meaning "dark" or "brown."
The name Dunne in Ireland is derived from the Ó Duinn and the Ó Doinn Gaelic septs who were based in County Laois, County Meath and County Wicklow. These septs in turn are descendants of the O'Regan noble family. It is in these counties that the majority of descendants can still be found. Hundreds of years ago, the Gaelic name used by the Dunn family in Ireland was Ó Duinn or Ó Doinn. Both Gaelic names are derived from the Gaelic word donn, which means "brown". Ó Doinn is the genitive case of donn. First found in county Meath, where they held a family seat from very ancient times.
Variations: Dunn, Dunne, Dun, Duen, O'Dunne, O'Doyne, Doine, Doin, O'Dunn.

Dunne Castles
The Dunnes formerly owned a number of castles in the midlands of Ireland. Today little remains of most of these castles, many were destroyed during the Cromwellian Invasion of Ireland.

Tinnahinch Castle
The principal seat of the Dunne family was Tinnahinch Castle. Originally known as "Baun Riaganach", the castle was built by Tadhg MacLaighnigh Ui Duinn in 1475 and was the residence of the chief of the Dunne's.
Tinnahinch Castle was located at the Barrow River, one mile south of Tinnahinch bridge. The name Tinnahinch originally means "house of the island", a tributary stream of the Barrow river surrounding the castle gives it the appearance of an island.
Tinnahinch Castle was destroyed by during the Cromwellian Invasion by forces led by Colonel John Hewson in 1653. At the time it was strongly defended by Charles Dunne and it required a full park of artillery from the invading forces to level the castle.
After the destruction of Tinnahinch Castle the principal seat of the Dunne family moved to Brittas Castle.
Unfortunately there remains nothing of the original castle apart from a wall which may have been part of the original building.

Brittas Castle
After the destruction of Tinnahinch Castle the Dunne Chief built a new home at Brittas, near Clonaslee, County Laois. Originally there was a thatched lodge located there and the O'Duinns built a mansion at his location.
In 1869, Major-General Francis Plunkett Dunne built a neo-gothic mansion at this location. The house had extensive gardens and also lake which was originally created as a reservoir.
In 1942 the building was burned down in a fire.

Ballinakill Castle
It was a coursed rubble and limestone building built between the River Clodiagh and River Gorragh by the Dunnes on the location of an earlier castle which was destroyed by Cromwellian invasion forces. It was built by Colonel Terence O'Dunne in 1680 who was killed at the Battle of Aughrim and is buried at the graveyard in Killeigh.

Coolnamoney Castle
Teige O'Doyne built the Dunne castle Coolnamoney Lower near the Glenlahan River. Not much is left of the castle today, but some of the original features can be seen in the ruins.

Castlebrack Castle
Castlebrack Castle was built by Tadhg MacLaighnigh Ui Duinn in 1475. It was built to be occupied by the Tanist, which was the name of the position held by the clan's deputy chief. This castle was second in size and importance to Tinnahinch Castle, which was the principal residence of the Dunnes. Terence O'Dunne completed a major refurbishment of the castle in 1688, however by 1838, all that was left of the castle was ruins.

Clarahill Castle
Clarahill Castle was built by a junior/younger branch of the Dunne family. It was built in 1600, and in 1900 it was destroyed for road material.

Ballinahemmy Castle
The Dunnes also built Ballinahemmy Castle near the town of Corrigeen, in County Laois, and its location is marked on the Ordnance Survey map.

Raskeen Castle
Raskeen Castle was built by Donal O'Dunne in 1584 and destroyed in 1691.

People with the surname Dunne
 Ben Dunne (born 1949), Irish entrepreneur and former director of Dunnes Stores
 Benny Dunne (born 1980), Irish hurler
 Bobby Dunne (1949–1992), Australian boxer of the 1960s and '70s 
 Bernard Dunne (born 1980), Irish professional boxer
 Colin Dunne (born 1968), professional Irish dancer
 Conor Dunne (born 1992), Irish cyclist, brother of Katy Dunne
 David Dunne (born 1995), Irish hurler 
 Dominick Dunne (1925–2009), American writer and investigative journalist
 Dominique Dunne (1959–1982), American actress, daughter of Dominick Dunne
 Edmund Francis Dunne (1835–1904), Chief Justice of the Arizona Territory, founder of San Antonio, Florida
 Edmund Michael Dunne (1864–1929), American prelate of the Roman Catholic Church and Bishop of Peoria
 Edward Fitzsimmons Dunne (1853–1937), American politician
 Edward Joseph Dunne (1848–1910), Irish-born prelate of the Roman Catholic Church and Bishop of Dallas
 Emmett Dunne (born 1956), Australian rules footballer
 Finley Peter Dunne (1867–1936), American author, writer and humorist
 Lawrence Francis "Frank" Dunne (1898–1937), Australian cartoonist
 Francis Charlton "Diver" Dunne (1875–1937), Australian rules footballer
 Gordon Dunne (1959–2021), Northern Irish politician
 Griffin Dunne (born 1955), American actor and film director, son of Dominick Dunne
 Irene Dunne (1898–1990), American actress
 Lady Jasmine Dunne (born 1973)
 J. W. Dunne (1875-1949), Irish born Aeronautical Inventor and philosopher, son of Irish born Sir John Hart Dunne 
 Jeff Dunne (born 1956), Australian rules footballer
 James E. Dunne (1882–1942), mayor of Providence 1927–1939
 Jimmy Dunne (1905–1949), Irish international footballer
 Jimmy Dunne (footballer born 1935), Irish footballer, son of Jimmy Dunne
 Jimmy Dunne (footballer born 1947), Irish footballer
 Joe Dunne (born 1973), Irish footballer
 John Dunne (disambiguation), multiple people
 Karen Dunne (born 1967), American track and road cyclist
 Katy Dunne, (born 1995), British tennis player, sister of Conor Dunne
 Liam Dunne (footballer) (born 1971), Irish footballer
 Liam Dunne (born 1968), Irish hurler
 Martin Dunne (English footballer) (1887–unknown), English footballer
 Michael Dunne (disambiguation), multiple people
 Olivia Dunne (born 2002), American gymnast and internet personality
 Paddy Dunne (Gaelic footballer)
 Paddy Dunne (politician) (1928–2006), Irish politician
 Pat Dunne (born 1943), Irish football goalkeeper
 Patrick Dunne (priest) (1818–1900), Irish priest active in Australia
 Pete Dunne, professional wrestler who is the WWE United Kingdom Champion and appears on NXT and NXT UK
 Peter Dunne (born 1954), New Zealand politician
 Philip Russell Rendel Dunne (1904–1965), MC (1943), Unionist M.P. 1935–1937
 Philip Dunne (writer) (1908–1992), Hollywood screenwriter and director
 Philip Dunne (Ludlow politician) (born 1958), British  politician
 Philippa Dunne, Irish actress and writer
 Reginald Dunne (Irish Republican Army), assassin
 Richard Dunne (born 1979), Irish footballer
 Robin Dunne (born 1976), Canadian actor
 Ross Dunne (born 1948), Australian rules footballer
 Seán Dunne (politician) (1918–1969), Irish Labour Party politician
 Stephen Dunne (actor) (1918–1977), American actor
 Stuart Dunne (Actor) (1957), Irish Actor
 Tal Dunne (born 1987), Welsh-born Israeli professional basketball player for Israeli team Ironi Nes Ziona
 Thomas Dunne (disambiguation), multiple people
 Thomas L. Dunne, American publisher of Thomas Dunne Books
 Tom Dunne, musician and Irish radio DJ
 Tommy Dunne (footballer born 1927) (1927–1988), Irish footballer
 Tommy Dunne (footballer born 1972), Irish footballer
 Tommy Dunne (born 1974), Irish hurler
 Tony Dunne (born 1941), Irish footballer
 Veronica Dunne (singer) (1927–2021), Irish singer and singing teacher

Other
 I Am Mary Dunne, novel
 Dunnes Stores
 George W. Dunne Golf Course and Driving Range
 Thomas Dunne Books
 Dunne-za

See also
 Dunn (surname)
 Donne

References

External links
 

English-language surnames
Surnames of Irish origin
Anglicised Irish-language surnames
Irish families